was an admiral in the Imperial Japanese Navy and  Naval Minister during World War II.

Biography
Oikawa was born into a wealthy family in rural Koshi County, Niigata Prefecture, but was raised in Morioka city, Iwate prefecture in northern Japan.

He was a graduate of the 31st class of the Imperial Japanese Naval Academy, ranking 76th out of 188 cadets. During the Russo-Japanese War, still as a midshipman, he served on the  during the Battle of Tsushima.

As a lieutenant, Oikawa served on the cruiser , and the battleship . He was given his first command, the destroyer  on 28 April 1911.

On graduation, Oikawa was promoted to lieutenant commander, and was appointed aide-de-camp to Crown Prince Hirohito in 1915–1922.

After his promotion to captain on 1 December 1923, Oikawa was assigned the cruiser , followed by the  the following year. He then served in a number of staff positions until his promotion to rear admiral on 10 December 1928. In 1930, Oikawa was appointed to the Imperial Japanese Navy General Staff, and in 1932 became Director of the Imperial Japanese Naval Academy. He was promoted to vice admiral on 15 November 1933. Oikawa strongly supported the London Naval Treaty while a member of the Imperial Japanese Navy General Staff, and was thus a member of the Treaty Faction within the navy.

Oikawa was subsequently appointed Commander in Chief of the IJN 3rd Fleet (1935), Imperial Japanese Navy Aviation Bureau (1936), China Area Fleet (1938) and Yokosuka Naval District (1940). He was promoted to full admiral on 15 November 1939.

Oikawa was appointed as Minister of the Navy in the second and third cabinets of Prime Minister Fumimaro Konoe between 5 September 1940 and 18 October 1941. While Navy Minister, he strove to maintain ties with the United States, and instructed his naval attachés in Washington DC to work together with the Japanese ambassador to prevent war from breaking out. Likewise, he strongly opposed suggestions that Japan should declare war on the Soviet Union in early 1941.

He continued to serve as Naval Councilor to near the end of World War II and was Chief of the Navy General Staff in late 1944 but resigned in May 1945 and was replaced by an Ōita native Toyoda Soemu in an attempt to soften down the Imperial Japanese Army's Ōita-born leadership. Oikawa retired from active duty on 5 September 1945.

References

Books

Notes

External links

1883 births
1958 deaths
People from Morioka, Iwate
Imperial Japanese Navy admirals
Japanese military personnel of the Russo-Japanese War
Japanese admirals of World War II
Ministers of the Imperial Japanese Navy